Pena is a surname. Notable people with the surname include:

Afonso Pena (1847–1909), Brazilian politician;
Danny Pena (born 1968), American soccer player;
Marius Pena (born 1985), Romanian soccer player;
Paul Pena (1950–2005), American singer.

See also
Peña (surname)